The 1982 Seiko Hong Kong Classic, also known as the Hong Kong Open, was a men's tennis tournament played on outdoor hard courts in Hong Kong that was part of the 1982 Grand Prix tennis circuit. It was the tenth edition of the event and was held from 1 November through 7 November 1982. Unseeded Pat Du Pré won the singles title.

Finals

Singles
 Pat Du Pré defeated  Morris Strode 6–3, 6–3
 It was Du Pré's only singles title of his career.

Doubles
 Charles Strode /  Morris Strode defeated  Kim Warwick /  Van Winitsky 6–4, 3–6, 6–2

References

External links
 ITF tournament edition details

Viceroy Classic
1982 in Hong Kong
Tennis in Hong Kong